David Lowell Rich (August 31, 1920 – October 21, 2001) was an American film director and producer. He directed nearly 100 films and TV episodes between 1950 and 1987. He was born in New York City. He began directing on a regular basis in 1950.  Rich won an Emmy for outstanding direction of a special in 1978 for The Defection of Simas Kudirka. His brother was director John Rich.

Selected filmography

 Have Rocket, Will Travel (1959) with the Three Stooges (Moe Howard, Larry Fine and Curly Joe DeRita)
 See How They Run (1964) with John Forsythe and Senta Berger
 Madame X (1966) with Lana Turner
 The Plainsman (1966) with Don Murray
 Rosie! (1967) with Rosalind Russell
 Eye of the Cat (1969) with Eleanor Parker
 Northeast of Seoul (1972) with Anita Ekberg and John Ireland
 The Judge and Jake Wyler (1972) with Bette Davis and Doug McClure
 Satan's School for Girls (1973) with Pamela Franklin and Kate Jackson
 Runaway! (1973) with Ben Johnson and Darleen Carr
 The Horror at 37,000 Feet (1973) with Buddy Ebsen
 SST: Death Flight (1977) with Lorne Greene and Peter Graves
 A Family Upside Down (1978) with Helen Hayes and Fred Astaire
 Little Women (1978) with Susan Dey and Meredith Baxter Birney
 The Concorde ... Airport '79 (1979) with Alain Delon, Susan Blakely and Robert Wagner
 Chu Chu and the Philly Flash (1981) with Alan Arkin and Carol Burnett
 Thursday's Child (1983) with Rob Lowe and Gena Rowlands
 Choices (1986) with George C. Scott and Jacqueline Bisset
 Infidelity (1987) with Kirstie Alley and Lee Horsley

References

External links

1920 births
2001 deaths
Film producers from New York (state)
Primetime Emmy Award winners
Film directors from New York City
American television directors